Space Dogs (a.k.a. Belka & Strelka — Star Dogs, original: Белка и Стрелка. Звёздные собаки, Belka i Strelka. Zvyozdnye sobaki) is a 2010 Russian computer-animated adventure comedy film. The film is based on the Soviet space dogs Belka and Strelka, and honors the first animals who survived an orbital space trip, the Korabl-Sputnik 2 flight in August, 1960. In Poland it became the leader of the box-office on its first weekend, although in the United States it grossed poorly, making only $14,408 due to its limited release.

Plot
A man in black is carrying a small cage from the Soviet Union to the U.S. president John F. Kennedy. In the cage is a present from Soviet premier Nikita Khrushchev to Caroline Kennedy, a stray dog named Pushok. He finds the other Kennedy pets and tells them his story.

Three years earlier, in Moscow 1960, a strange man showed up, who was catching street dogs and taking them away. Once he tried to catch a terrier puppy named Strelka, but she ran away with her friend, a rat named Lenny. Then, Strelka went to dig for bones and Venya went to a pay telephone to get some money.

While Strelka was running from the strange man, Vova, a circus pig, became too large to fly in his rocket, and Belka, a circus dog, flew in his place. Belka loses control of the rocket and flew away from the circus. After some time she crashed onto the payphone where Lenny was looking for coins. The crash broke the phone and Lenny got all the money from the broken phone. After the crash Belka, Strelka, and Lenny were met by three other street dogs: a French bulldog named Bula, a pug named Mula, and a wolf named Pirate. Belka and Strelka ran from the other street dogs but the next morning all three of them were caught by the strange man.

After being caught the dogs are put on a train to Baikonur where they ended up at a Soviet space program training center. There they met their trainer, Kazbek the German Shepherd, who had to choose the two best dogs from the group. A month before the launch date, the chosen group was Bula and Mula, but on the final training day, Lenny came in first, with Belka and Strelka in 2nd and 3rd place. Belka and Strelka needed to fly with Lenny because he was first and the flight group was chosen.

At the end of their flight, Strelka wanted to stay in space, because her mother had said that her father, Sirius, is living among the stars. Kazbek shows up having stowed away on their flight and tried to convince Strelka to turn around. They saw a formation of objects flying towards them, believing them to be Space Dogs but they turned out to be meteorites, they got hit by a meteorite shower and the rocket caught fire from the damage. Strelka, Lenny, and Kazbek went to the back of the rocket to fight the fire with their feeding formula as water, Belka was afraid but still jumped through the fire ring into the driver's seat to turn the rocket back towards Earth. Strelka extinguished the fire, and Kazbek confessed his love for Belka. The dogs look at various constellations and Strelka salutes Sirius in lieu of her father. The dog flight crew makes it back to Earth alive.

Strelka, Belka, and Lenny receive a hero's welcome, and it is discovered that Kazbek stowed away on the flight, but the Scientist in charge of the project tells him that Soviet Propaganda won't allow the world to know that a stow-away had been on the flight.

The other Kennedy pets, led by the cat, don't believe Pushok's story, except one French dog who sees the Cosmonaut Patch on Pushok's cushion. She then asks him to tell her what happened afterward.
Strelka returns to live with her mother. Venya holds conferences, telling his story to any willing to listen to him. Belka returns to her circus as the main star, flying the repaired rocket from earlier in the film. Kazbek lives together with his love Belka, and everyone lived happily ever after.

During the end credits, real-life archive footage from the Soviet Space Program and its Soviet space dogs is shown.

Production
The directors Svyatoslav Ushakov and Inna Evlannikova, as specialists with foreign experience, were finally approved. Evlannikova - in the words of the executive producer, "a powerful production worker" - worked with everything that was directly related to animation. Ushakov was mainly engaged in the development of an artistic concept, storyboards, etc.

To recreate Moscow in the 60s and the cosmodrome, animators studied photographs of those years and newsreels for a long time. The prototype of the circus artist Belka was the circus artist - the heroine of Lyubov Orlova from the 1936 feature film " Circus ". The director Svyatoslav Ushakov specially went to the Circus on Tsvetnoy Boulevard, which was the prototype of the Belka circus.

In parallel with Russian animators at KinoAtis studio, two Indian subcontractors “Cornershop Animation "and" Blowfish FX ", which were engaged in animation and rendering, worked with elaborate materials received from KinoAtis using Autodesk Maya and Pixar RenderMan (produced by the Pixar Animation Studios subsidiary of Walt Disney Studios, which is another studio owned by The Walt Disney Company).

Before the official release of the film Karoprokat looked at the International Space Station by cosmonauts Maxim Suraev and Oleg Kotov, who positively characterized it from the point of view of space specificity . Also, the first spectators were their wives and children on Earth. with some scenes of the film have been shown for some time in the program “ Спокойной ночи, малыши!”, Because the transmission format does not allow showing it in full. The movie was premiered on television in Russia 1 " on May 2, 2011.

Home media
Space Dogs (English Dub) was released on DVD, Blu-ray, Blu-ray 3D & Digital Copy on 8 June 2012.

Reception 

Sandie Angulo Chen of Common Sense Media gave it 3 out of 5 stars.

Soundtrack

Sequels
A sequel Space Dogs: Moon Adventures was released in Russia in 2014 and it was dubbed in English and released the United States on 26 August 2016. Mike Disa was the director on the Americanized version. In 2020, the third sequel to the Space Dogs series, Space Dogs: Return to Earth released in Russia on 24 September 2020. The film marks the establishment of the Space Dogs trilogy. Despite the release date being rescheduled due to unprecedented global events, the release date for Belka and Strelka: Caribbean Mystery (Russian title) coincided just 1 month after the 60th anniversary of the historic flight into space by the famous Soviet dogs Belka and Strelka and was one of the first major releases of Russian cinema industry.

See also 
 History of Russian animation
 List of animated feature films of 2010
 Space Dogs: Return to Earth (2020)

References

External links
 
 
 

Russian and Soviet animated science fiction films
2010 films
2010 animated films
2010 3D films
3D animated films
2010 computer-animated films
2010s science fiction films
Russian children's fantasy films
Animals in space
Russian animated feature films
Animated films about dogs
Films about space programs
2010s children's adventure films
2010s children's animated films
Films set in 1960